St. Peter and St. Paul's Church, Mansfield is a parish church in the Church of England located in the town centre of Mansfield, Nottinghamshire.

The church is Grade I listed by the Department for Digital, Culture, Media and Sport as a building of outstanding architectural or historic interest.

In the churchyard, the war memorial and railings five metres south of the church are Grade II listed for special architectural or historic interest.

The Boundary Wall and Gates to the Churchyard are also Grade II listed.

History

The original church dates from the early 12th century. Chantry chapels and the clerestory were added in the 15th or 16th centuries, and the spire dates from 1699.

In 2013, the church held a 900-year celebration, claiming to have evidence that the original tower was completed by December, 1113.

Bells

There are eight bells in the tower dating from 1603. The bells were cast in 1948.

Organ
The 3-manual church organ was acquired in 1970 from Clare College, Cambridge It was substantially altered and enlarged by Noel Mander of London before installation in the south chapel in 1971. There was further work and restoration done, and the organ was re-consecrated at the end of 2000.

Organists
 Maria Lister 1795–1801
 Joseph Webster ca. 1829
 Miss Cursham ca. 1869
 William Blakely 1883–1891
 Arthur Howard Bonser 1889–1902
 Miss M Coleman 1904–1911
 Dr George P Allen 1911–1957 (formerly organist of St. Peter's Church, Stapenhill, Burton upon Trent)
 C K Turner 1957–1959
 Malcolm Cousins 1959–1993
 David Sheeran Butterworth 1993–1995
 John Gull 1996
 David Cowlishaw 1997
 John P Rose 1998–2007
 Paul Hayward 2007-8
 John Marriott 2009-

Gallery

References

Sources
The Buildings of England, Nottinghamshire. Nikolaus Pevsner

External links

Church of England church buildings in Nottinghamshire
Grade I listed churches in Nottinghamshire
12th-century church buildings in England
Buildings and structures in Mansfield